The Diana Dors Show was a British variety-comedy television show that ran from 1959 to 1961. It starred Diana Dors and her then-husband Richard Dawson. It was made when Dors' film career was in decline.

The series premiered in May 1959. The Manchester Guardian called it "vapid and amateurish beyond belief".

References

External links
The Diana Dors Show at IMDb

1959 British television series debuts